"Zu spät" (German for too late) is a punk song by German band Die Ärzte. It was the eleventh track and the second single from their 1984 album Debil.

It's a humorous song about jealousy and revenge. The narrator is devastated over his love interest's preference of a wealthier rival and compares their capabilities of entertaining the girl throughout the song, while fantasizing that he will be a star someday and will then reject her, when she'll come crawling back.

Tracks
1. Seite (1st side) 
 "Zu spät" – 3:20
2. Seite (2nd side)
 "Mädchen" – 2:55

Maxi
Rote Seite (red side)
 "Zu spät" (Urlaub) – 7:05
Weiße Seite (white side)
 "Ärzte-Theme (Instrumental)" – 2:00
 "Mädchen" – 2:55

The live medley 

"Live – Zu spät..." (1988) is a single for the medley "Zu spät (Hit Summer Mix '88)" (on the album just "Medley") from their 1988 album Live – Nach uns die Sintflut. The medley is composed of many covers, but most of it is the song "Zu spät", which actually ends the medley too (after "Blueprint").

Track listing

 "Zu spät (Hit Summer Mix '88)"
 > "When Will I Be Famous" (Bros cover) – 0:39
 > "Tell It to My Heart" (Taylor Dayne cover) – 0:17
 > "Whenever You Need..." (O'Chi Brown cover) – 0:09
 > "I Should Be So Lucky" (Kylie Minogue cover) – 0:07
 > "My Bed Is Too Big" (Blue System cover) – 0:10
 > "Born to Love" (Den Harrow cover) – 0:06
 > "Kiss" (Prince cover) – 0:15
 > "Zu spät" – 3:55
 > "Blueprint" (Rainbirds cover) – 0:23
 "Zu spät (Single-Remix '85)" – 3:20
 "Sie tun es" – 3:08

Maxi
 "Zu spät (Hit Summer Mix '88)"
 > "When Will I Be Famous" – 0:39
 > "Tell It to My Heart" – 0:17
 > "Whenever You Need..." – 0:09
 > "I Should Be So Lucky" – 0:07
 > "My Bed Is Too Big" – 0:10
 > "Born to Love" – 0:06
 > "Kiss" – 0:15
 > "Zu spät" – 3:55
 > "Blueprint" – 0:23
 "Zu spät (Single-Version '85)" – 3:12
 "Zu spät (Maxi-Version '85)"  – 6:43
 "Sie tun es" – 3:05

B-sides
 "Zu spät (Single-Version '85)" was initially released on "Zu spät" (1985).
 "Zu spät (Maxi-Version '85)" was first released on "Zu spät (Special Maxi)" and later on "Ist das alles? (13 Höhepunkte mit den Ärzten)".
 "Sie tun es" [They're doing it] is one of many songs from the Gabi & Uwe series.

Personnel
Farin Urlaub – lead vocals, guitar
Sahnie – bass
Bela B. – drums

Charts

1985 singles
Die Ärzte songs
Songs written by Farin Urlaub
1985 songs
CBS Records singles